North Bullitt High School is a school located in Hebron Estates, Kentucky, United States, a small city served by the post office of nearby Shepherdsville.  Opened in 1975, it is part of the Bullitt County Public Schools district. There are currently over 1,100 students enrolled at NBHS.

The school underwent renovations in 2005 which were fully completed by Fall 2008, adding a second story with additional classrooms. Another expansion for a career readiness center with fifteen additional classrooms was finished in 2014.

Athletic activities
Archery
Baseball (boys')
Basketball (boys')
Basketball (girls')
USAJROTC - color guard and rifle drill team
Bowling
Cheerleading
Cross country
Dance team
Football
Golf
Marching band
Powerlifting
Soccer (boys')
Soccer (girls')
Softball
Swimming
Tennis (boys')]
Tennis (girls')]
Track (boys')
Track (girls')
Volleyball
Wrestling

Fight song
Go NB Eagles, we are backing you
To our colors, green and gold
Forever we'll be true
Rah, Rah, Rah
Go NB Eagles, on to vic-tor-y
Fight for the fame
Of our great name
Go you Eagles,
Win this Ga-a-ame

Other activities
Academic Team
Beta Club
Chorus
FBLA
FCA
FCCLA
FEA
HOSA
NHS
JROTC
Student Council

Notable alumni
 Tom Mabe, class of 1985 - comedian and performer
 Logan Wyatt, class of 2016 - Professional baseball first baseman

Notes and references

External links
 
 Bullitt County Schools website

Public high schools in Kentucky
Schools in Bullitt County, Kentucky
Educational institutions established in 1975
1975 establishments in Kentucky